Dmitrii Matveevich Sintsov (21 November 1867, in Vyatka – 28 January 1946) was a Russian mathematician known for his work in the theory of conic sections and non-holonomic geometry. 

He took a leading role in the development of mathematics at the University of Kharkiv, serving as chairman of the Kharkov Mathematical Society for forty years, from 1906 until his death at the age of 78.

See also
Aleksandr Lyapunov

Bibliography

External links

1867 births
1946 deaths
People from Kirov, Kirov Oblast
People from Vyatsky Uyezd
Russian mathematicians
Academic staff of the National University of Kharkiv
First convocation members of the Verkhovna Rada of the Ukrainian Soviet Socialist Republic